Law of the jungle is usually an expression that can mean "every man for himself," "anything goes," "might makes right," "survival of the strongest", etc.

Law of the Jungle may also refer to:

Law of the Jungle (film), a 1942  American film directed by Jean Yarbrough
Law of the Jungle, a Hardy Boys novel
Law of the Jungle (album), a 1994 oldskool jungle compilation album
Law of the Jungle (TV series), South Korean reality television series